The Southbury Child is a play by Stephen Beresford.

Production history 
The play premiered at the Chichester Festival Theatre running from 13 June to 25 June, before transferring to the Bridge Theatre, London running from 1 July to 27 August 2022. It is directed by Nicholas Hytner and stars Alex Jennings as David Highland.

Cast and characters

Critical reception 
The play opened to positive reviews from critics.

References 

2022 plays
British plays